Radunsky (feminine: Radunskaya) is a surname.

 (1912-1982), Russia ballet dancer, choreographer, and teacher
Ivan Radunsky,  played the part of Bim in the clown duo of Bim Bom
Vladimir Radunsky, Russian-born American artist, designer, author and illustrator